Barbara Croft is an American writer.

Life
She grew up in Iowa.  She is a member of the Society of Midland Authors.  She lives in Chicago.

Awards
 1998 Drue Heinz Literature Prize

Reviews

Works

References

External links

1944 births
Living people
American short story writers